On 2 July 2005, a Live 8 concert was held at Mary Fitzgerald Square, Newtown, Johannesburg, South Africa.

The event is also referred to as "Live 8 Johannesburg", "Live 8 Jo'burg", and "Live 8 South Africa".

A speech was given by former South African president Nelson Mandela, who was received with a 5-minute standing ovation by the audience.

Lineup and running order
 Nelson Mandela (Host) (JB 12:00)
 Jabu Khanyile & Bayete (JB 12:25)
 Lindiwe (JB 13:15)
 Lucky Dube - "Feel Irie" (JB 13:55)
 Mahotella Queens (JB 14:35)
 Malaika - "Destiny" (JB 15:15)
 Orchestra Baobab - Medley (JB 15:45)
 Oumou Sangaré (JB 16:15)
 Zola (JB 16:50)
 Vusi Mahlasela - "When You Come Back" (JB 17:20)

Live 8 events
2005 in South Africa
21st century in Johannesburg
Culture of Johannesburg
July 2005 events in South Africa